Chika Lann is a Nigerian filmmaker, actress, former model, and television personality. She is often regarded as a controversial figure over her remarks about cost and maintaining her hairstyle. She made her Nollywood debut as a producer for the 2019 film The Millions.

Career 
Chika pursued her higher studies in France and in Switzerland after completing her primary education in Nigeria. She graduated from the University of Geneva and studied image consultancy at Sterling Style Academy. After completing her studies, she pursued her career in modeling in Paris. She has modeled for popular designer brand Bretz. She then returned to Nigeria to venture into the television industry. She initiated a reality TV show, The Expatriate Wives, which became a successful show in the country.

Chika Lann then ventured into film industry and served as a producer for the film The Millions which is one of the most expensive films to be made in the history of Nigerian cinema.

Controversies 
She has also been sidelined for her controversial remarks on her hairstyle and publicity purposes. In 2018, she became an internet sensation after claiming that she spends and maintains her avant-garde hair for 40 million naira. The comments she made herself were widely criticized on social media and were slammed for her attempting to get attention.

She also received criticism for her attempt to gain publicity after uploading a few videos of her giving a cheque to a sweeper. However, she denied the allegations and revealed that it was the team of filmmakers who persuaded her to upload the videos in order to motivate others to do good things.

References

External links 

Living people
Nigerian film producers
Nigerian film actresses
Nigerian female models
University of Geneva alumni
Year of birth missing (living people)
Nigerian television personalities
21st-century Nigerian actresses